RAPIEnet (Real-time Automation Protocols for Industrial Ethernet) is Korea's first Ethernet international standard for real-time data transmission.
An Ethernet-based industrial networking protocol  developed in-house by LSIS guarantees real-time transmission and is registered as an international standard. (IEC 61158-3-21: 2010, IEC 61158-4-21: 2010, IEC 61158-5-21: 2010, IEC 61158-6-21: 2010, IEC 61784-2: 2010, IEC 62439-7)
An embedded Ethernet switch with two ports enables the network expansion in a daisy chain without the need for an additional external switch, easy installation and wiring reduction.
With 100Mbit/s/1Gbit/s transmission speed, electrical and optical media can be used together.
Supports transmission modes such as Unicast, Multicast and Broadcast.
Supports "Store & Forward”and “Cut Through” switching.

Acquired Standards

International Standards
IEC 61158-3-21: 2010, Industrial communication networks - Fieldbus specifications - Part 3-21: Data-link layer service definition - Type 21 elements.
IEC 61158-4-21: 2010, Industrial communication networks - Fieldbus specifications - Part 4-21: Data-link layer protocol specification - Type 21 elements.
IEC 61158-5-21: 2010, Industrial communication networks - Fieldbus specifications - Part 5-21: Application layer service definition - Type 21 elements.
IEC 61158-6-21: 2010, Industrial communication networks - Fieldbus specifications - Part 6-21: Application layer protocol specification - Type 21 elements.
IEC 61784-2: 2010, Industrial communication networks - Profiles - Part 2: Additional fieldbus profiles for real-time networks based on ISO/IEC 8802-3.
IEC 62439-7, Industrial communication networks - High availability automation networks - Part 7: Ring-based Redundancy Protocol (RRP)

RAPIEnet Technology

Protocol Stack Structure

Embedded dual port switch motion

An embedded hardware-based switch is adopted for real-time data transmission.
With the full-duplex communication support, each node has dual link routes in a ring topology.

Frame Format

RAPIEnet Ether type: 0x88FE

Topology

Recovery System
With an embedded switch and full-duplex, it has dual link routes and communication fault tolerance, enabling fast recovery capabilities.
 - Recovery time < 10 ms

Transmits signal from Device 1 to Device 3.
A fault occurs between Device 2 and Device 3.
Notify the fault from Device 2 to Device 1.
Transmits signal back from Device 1 to Device 3.

Flexible Hybrid Structure

Fiber Optics/Copper Media
 - Copper: Low installation costs with relatively big noise.
 - Optics: High installation costs with low noise and relatively long wiring.
Simple and efficient wiring is available by combining the features of two wires that have advantages and disadvantages.

System Diagram Using RAPIEnet

Others

Other international standards in process
IEC 61784-5-17, Industrial communication networks - Profiles - Part 5-17: Installation of fieldbuses - Installation profiles for CPF 17 (to be registered as an IEC international standard in 2012)

References 

Industrial Ethernet